The epithet the Merciful may refer to:

 Ashot III of Armenia (died 977), Armenian king
 John the Merciful (c. 552-between 616 and 620), Patriarch of Alexandria and Christian saint

See also
 John the Hairy, also known as John the Merciful of Rostov, a 16th-century holy fool (yurodivy) of the Russian Orthodox Church
 Ming the Merciless, the main villain in the Flash Gordon comic strip and related works
 Mordru the Merciless, the villain in the DC Comics story arc of the same name

Lists of people by epithet